The Chillout Project: A Soundtrack To Modern City Life is the third volume of Anton Ramos' The Chillout Project series.

Track listing
 AR presents SWIM - Longing (All I Hear)
 Ottmar Liebert & Luna Negra - Bombay Night Of Dreams
 Bliss - Kissing
 Roger Sanchez - Another Chance (Afterlife Mix)
 Sade - Cherish The Day (Sade Remix)
 Chicane - Low Sun
 Santessa - Best Thing
 Ski Oakenful - On My Way
 Jam and Spoon - Suspicious Minds
 Schneider TM - The Light 3000
 Anggun - Chaque Jour Sans Fievre
 Zero 7 - Destiny (Hefner's Destiny Chill)
 Archive - Cloud In The Sky (Aim Remix)
 I-Monster - Daydream In Blue
 Midfield General - Reach Out

2002 compilation albums
The Chillout Project albums